Omo Forest Reserve is a preserved area of tropical rainforest in the Nigerian state of Ogun, in the south-west part of the country. The terrain is largely flat and well-drained, with some low rolling hills, and forms part of the Omo River watershed.

Description
This forest reserve consists of a large area of tropical rainforest covering . In the northern part of the reserve, the vegetation consists of a dry evergreen mixed deciduous forest, while in the south, it consists of a moist, mixed, semi-deciduous forest. Parts of the reserve consist of primary forest with mature trees, especially near the watercourses. However, large portions have been disturbed, with the felling of the original trees and the establishment of plantations. At the centre of the reserve, a plot of  has been designated a strict nature reserve, and this portion is now a UNESCO Biosphere Reserve.

Biodiversity
Over two hundred species of tree have been recorded in the reserve, the most common trees being Diospyros spp., Drypetes spp., Strombosia pustulata, Rinorea dentata and Voacanga africana, and the most common plant families include Araceae, Asteraceae, Ebenaceae, Faboideae, Liliaceae, Poaceae, Rubiaceae and Violaceae. Also recorded in the  reserve are 125 species of bird, and among a number of mammals present are such endangered species as chimpanzees, elephants and the  white-throated guenon monkey.

Conservation
The reserve is subject to poaching, illegal timber extraction, and uncontrolled agricultural activities. The Nigerian Forest Elephant Group is a conservation charity, established in 1989, that aims to educate the local community about the benefits of conservation and to protect the forest environment.

References

Forest Reserves of Nigeria
Nigerian lowland forests
Protected areas of Nigeria